The Clemson Tigers football team competes as part of the National Collegiate Athletic Association (NCAA) Division I Football Bowl Subdivision (FBS), representing Clemson University in the Atlantic Division of the Atlantic Coast Conference (ACC). Since the establishment of the team in 1896, Clemson has appeared in 48 bowl games. Included in these games are 9 combined appearances in the traditional "Big Four" bowl games (the Rose, Sugar, Cotton, and Orange).

Key

Bowl games

Notes

References
General

Specific

Clemson Tigers
Clemson Tigers bowl games